The London 10 km Marathon Swimming International was an event which took place in the Serpentine. It took place on 13 August 2011 and served as the test event for marathon swimming at the 2012 Summer Olympics.

Result

Men

Women

References

External links

10km Marathon Swimming International